Stuart Wagstaff  (13 February 192510 March 2015) was an English-born Australian entertainer who was active in all genres of the industry including theatre, television and film and music and stage management.

Wagstaff was born in Great Durnford, Wiltshire, England, and grew up on a farm with his parents and two older sisters. His father was very strict and emotionally abusive and he received little affection from his mother. His mother, however, frequently took him and his sisters to see plays and pantomime, generating an early interest in the arts. 

In September 1940, at the insistence of his father, Wagstaff joined the Royal Navy as an apprentice aircraft mechanic in the Fleet Air Arm. He served at naval air stations and on aircraft carriers until the end of the war, but considered himself to be a poor mechanic. He frequently volunteered for ships' concert parties to further his interest in acting.

Career

After the war Wagstaff joined the Windsor Repertory theatre as an assistant stage manager, occasionally taking small roles in plays. He then joined the Whitley repertory theatre in which he took part in up to 48 plays and four weeks of pantomime each year as well as a few West End, film and television appearances.

Wagstaff first came to Australia in 1958 to appear in the J. C. Williamson theatre production Not in the Book. In 1959, Williamson put him into the original My Fair Lady production, with which he was associated for the next four and a half years, the last two and half playing Professor Henry Higgins, through all the Australian and New Zealand capital cities. Following this he took over the male lead in the stage musical The Sound of Music.

Wagstaff's early Australia television appearances consisted of commercials, and a role in the 1960 Crawford Productions play Seagulls Over Sorrento. Other dramatic appearances included three episodes of the drama series Whiplash (1960), the ABC play Concord Of Sweet Sounds (1963), and episodes of the ABC's historical serial The Hungry Ones (1963).

In 1964 he appeared as the host of the Channel 7 variety show Studio 'A' and in 1965 he replaced the ailing Eric Baume as the "Beast" on the Channel 7 daytime show, Beauty and the Beast. This production established him as one of Australia's firm television favourites. During this two-and-a-half year period with Beauty and the Beast, he also appeared in leading roles in several stage productions including There's a Girl in My Soup, Present Laughter, Private Lives, several theatre restaurant revues, presented ATN-7's news program The Wagstaff Report (1965), and a 1966 episode of the drama series Homicide.

In 1968 he became host of a major Tonight show on the Seven Network. He later moved to the Nine Network to become one of the regular hosts of In Melbourne Tonight. During the following three years he hosted several shows on the Nine Network, including The Sound of Music and a regular late night interview show.

Impact of smoking advertising on his career

Wagstaff's suave style led to his advertising Benson & Hedges, a brand of British cigarettes, with the tagline "When only the best will do ... and isn't that all the time?" In a 2003 interview published in The Age, journalist Chris Beck commented:

The Non Smokers' Movement of Australia website (issue 18, May–June 1997) wrote in "Smoking Frontman Expresses Late Regrets":

Later career and death 

After a three-year stint in Hollywood, working in film and television, Wagstaff returned to Australia in 1975 and was immediately kept busy with TV appearances all over the country, including being a regular panellist on Channel 9's Celebrity Squares, then two years as permanent panellist on the 0-10 Network's Blankety Blanks, plus seven seasons as the host/presenter on the ABC's Stuart Wagstaff's World Playhouse.

Apart from television, Wagstaff remained active in his first love, the theatre. In late 1979 he appeared again as Professor Higgins in My Fair Lady and a successful national tour followed in which he was also a co-producer. About this time he also produced Sydney and Melbourne seasons of the American stage comedy Father's Day. In 1981 he toured as the narrator in the  successful Rocky Horror Show starring Daniel Abineri and repeated this with a second tour a few years later which featured Russell Crowe. In 1982 Wagstaff appeared in a leading role in the play Noises Off which had a successful national tour. In 1983 he played the lead in Blithe Spirit at Marian Street Theatre in Sydney and then went on to host the Midday Movie and Friday Night Movies on the Seven Network for two years.

Wagstaff's television guest roles in the 1990s included appearances in G.P., Rafferty's Rules, A Country Practice and All Saints. He often appeared on The Midday Show and Good Morning Australia. He appeared on most of Channel 7 Perth's telethon and live broadcasts as well. The late 1980s and the 1990s saw  Wagstaff on stage with Sydney seasons and subsequent tours of Noises Off, Black Comedy, The Winslow Boy, Lend Me A Tenor and Gershwin's musical Crazy For You. He also appeared in the role of Old Cookson in the theatrical production of Pan at the Capitol Theatre, Sydney. Cameron Mackintosh’s production of Oliver!, had Wagstaff returning to the stage in the role of Mr. Brownlow.

Wagstaff died from complications associated with pulmonary fibrosis, aged 90, on 10 March 2015.

Honours

On 26 January 1998 Wagstaff was appointed a Member of the Order of Australia (AM) for service to the community, particularly through the Channel 7 Perth Telethon Trust by raising funds for charities that support children's medical research.

Filmography

In character 
 A Night to Remember (1958) - Titanic Steward (uncredited)
 Seagulls Over Sorrento (1960, TV)
 Sunstruck (1972) - Announcer
 For Pete's Sake (1974) - Man in Chandelier Store - aka July Pork Bellies
 Is There Anybody There? (1975, TV) - Lars Dickinson
 The Dick Emery Show in Australia (1977, TV Series) - Various Characters
 All at Sea (1977, TV) - Mr. Arthur Pickering
 Bit Part (1978, TV) - Bernard
 The Journalist (1979) - Courtney Lewers

As himself 
 Beauty and the Beast (1964, TV Series) - Himself (1966–1968)
 In Melbourne Tonight (1957, TV Series) - Himself (1970)
 Name That Tune (1975, TV Series) - Himself
 Blankety Blanks (1977, TV Series) - Himself - Panelist
 Graham Kennedy: Farewell to the King (2005, TV) - Himself

Guest appearances 
 Whiplash  playing "Jimmy Quicksilver" in episode: "The Remittance Man" (episode # 1.11) 29 April 1961
 Whiplash  playing "Jimmy Quicksilver" in episode: "A Portrait of Gunpowder" (episode # 1.22) 22 July 1961
 Whiplash  playing "Lieutenant Hoffman" in episode: "The Adelaide Arabs" (episode # 1.34) 14 October 1961
 Homicide  playing "Stanley Copeland" in episode: "Death Us Do Part" (episode 71) 26 July 1966
 The Partridge Family  playing "Head Waiter" in episode: "The Last of Howard" (episode # 4.7) 27 October 1973
 Temperatures Rising  playing "Thornton" in episode: "Healer Man" (episode # 2.18) 15 August 1974
 All Saints  playing "Reg Howard" in episode: "Revelations" (episode # 1.20) 30 June 1998
 Bullpitt! Playing "Tyrone Wilde" in episode:  "One Hump or Two?" Season 2, Episode 6 9 Apr. 1998

References

External links 
 https://www.imdb.com/name/nm0906193
 http://www.eservice.com.au/x/austrn/speaker548.html

1925 births
2015 deaths
Australian male comedians
Australian male stage actors
Australian television personalities
British emigrants to Australia
English male comedians
English male stage actors
English television personalities
Fleet Air Arm personnel of World War II
Members of the Order of Australia
People from Salisbury
Royal Navy sailors